Jamal Harris Bhuyan (born 10 April 1990) is a professional footballer who plays as a midfielder for Bangladeshi club Sheikh Russel KC in the Bangladesh Premier League. Born in Denmark, he captains the Bangladesh national team.

Early life
Jamal Bhuyan was born in the Danish town of Glostrup in 1990. He grew up in the suburb of Brøndby Nord. Bhuyan's parents migrated to Denmark from Bangladesh in the late 60s. At the age of 15, Bhuyan began playing for the youth team of Danish club Brøndby IF. He scored a goal in an important match against rivals F.C. Copenhagen. After the match, the opposition coach met him and offered him a place in the team, which Bhuyan accepted.

By the time Bhuyan turned 16, he was on the verge of being promoted to the senior team of Copenhagen. However, while his career was struck with a massive blow, after getting stuck in the middle of a gang fight, he was shot four times. One of the bullets reportedly missing his heart by two centimetres. He found himself lying in the hospital bed after being in a coma for two days, later undergoing  12 surgeries, and although the chances of him playing professional football were slim, he returned to the game, eventually having to drop down to the lower divisions of Denmark. He later opened up in an interview about the difficulties he faced returning to football, stating "A few people around me, they died. But, you know, I survived. Because of the injury, I did not have any feeling in my right hand. So the doctors wanted to take some nerves from my foot and put it up in my arm. But I told them, I need my legs."

Club career 

Bhuyan began his senior career with Danish 2nd Division club Hellerup IK, where he spent 3 seasons and scored one goal in one match. In 2008, at age 16, Bhuyan was sent an offer letter to represent the Bangladesh national football team from the Bangladesh Football Federation. However, he had to turn down the offer due to family complications. Nonetheless, in 2012, Bhuyan joined Abahani Limited Dhaka, one of the biggest clubs in Bangladesh. After a two-year stint, during which he also made his national team debut, he returned to Denmark for a brief period, playing for second division clubs BK Avarta and Avedøre IF.

In 2014, Bhuyan returned to Bangladesh joining  Sheikh Jamal SC. In his debut season, he won the domestic double, lifting both the 2015 Bangladesh Premier League and 2015 Federation Cup. He also earned his first continental trophy, winning the 2014 King's Cup in Bhutan. He later went on to make six appearances for the club in their disappointing 2016 AFC Cup campaign. In 2016, he moved to Sheikh Russell, where he only made a couple of appearances.

In the 2017–18 season, Bhuyan joined Saif SC. He played for Chittagong Abahani on loan only in 2019 Sheikh Kamal International Club Cup. He scored one goal against Young Elephants FC. In 2019, he was made captain of Saif SC. In 2020, he joined Indian club Kolkata Mohammedan in the I-League on a season-long loan deal. In the match against Churchill Brothers, Bhuyan became only the 2nd Bangladeshi to captain an Indian football club when he wore the armband for Mohammedan SC. The first being Monem Munna who captained East Bengal Club in the 1990s.

International career
On 31 August 2013, Bhuyan made his debut for Bangladesh national football team against Nepal in the 2013 SAFF Championship, becoming the first non-resident player to represent the national side. Bhuyan became the MVP (most valuable player) in the Bangabandhu Cup where eight countries took part. On 19 August 2018, Bhuyan scored the winning goal in the stoppage time in a 1–0 victory over Qatar national under-23 football team to help Bangladesh national under-23 football team qualify for the round of 16 in the 2018 Asian Games and also created history by making Bangladesh qualify for the first time in the Asian Games's knockout stage.

Personal life
On 18 May 2019, he was invited to La Liga studio for a live commentary along with Joe Morrison and John Burridge. The match was between Real Valladolid and Valencia CF. He was also the commentator for the match between SD Eibar and FC Barcelona.

On 5 January 2020, Jamal Bhuyan was married, the wedding ceremony taking place in his birthplace, Copenhagen, Denmark.

International goals

U23

Senior
Scores and results list Bangladesh's goal tally first.

Honours

Club

Sheikh Jamal Dhanmondi Club
 Bangladesh Premier League: 2015
 Federation Cup: 2014–15
 Kings Cup: 2014

International
Bangladesh U23
 South Asian Games
   Bronze medal (2): 2016, 2019
Bangladesh
 Bangabandhu Gold Cup
  Runner-up (1): 2015

Individual
 2015 Bangabandhu Cup Player of the Tournament
 2014 King's Cup Player of the Tournament

References

External links
 

1990 births
Living people
Footballers from Copenhagen
Danish people of Bangladeshi descent
Danish men's footballers
Bangladeshi footballers
Bangladesh international footballers
Bangladesh Football Premier League players
Sheikh Jamal Dhanmondi Club players
Association football midfielders
Footballers at the 2014 Asian Games
Footballers at the 2018 Asian Games
BK Avarta players
Asian Games competitors for Bangladesh
South Asian Games bronze medalists for Bangladesh
South Asian Games medalists in football
Saif SC players
Avedøre IF players
Bangladeshi expatriate footballers
Bangladeshi expatriate sportspeople in India
Expatriate footballers in India
I-League players
Mohammedan SC (Kolkata) players
Abahani Limited (Dhaka) players
Abahani Limited (Chittagong) players
People from Glostrup Municipality
Sheikh Russel KC players